Soraba is a Taluk in Shivamogga district in the state of Karnataka in India. Anavatti is the Major Town and commercial centre in Soraba Taluk.

It has an average elevation of 580 metres (1902 feet).

History

The town derives its name from its earlier name Surabhipura meaning town of Surabhi. Surabhi was a holy cow which used to milk on a stone statue of the god Sri Ranganatha.

A temple is built on the same place where the holy cow used to milk and it is now the Sri Ranganatha temple. The story says that the temple was built by a local landlord from Halesoraba on the bay of river Dandavati. This is recorded on a manuscript written in Old Kannada script on the stone tower by the river Dandavati. B

Soraba is now a taluk headquarters. Soraba's main road (Ratha Beedhi) is the only road (which stretches for approximately a kilometre) and has its main shops and hospitals.

From 1999 onwards, Soraba town was improved in many ways economically, and is seeing a lot of investment in new shops.sorada has sri Bangarappa stache  And new Bus stop

Education

Government Pre University College. Anavatti
GPUC Anavatti (Known as Junior College Anavatti, Karnataka Public School) is a college in Shivamogga District. More than 5000+ Students Studying from LKG to II PUC in Both Kannada and English medium.

HPR (HariPrasadRai) College of Nursing. Soraba
This private college of nursing offers BSc nursing course under Rajiv Gandhi University of Health Sciences.

Demographics

 India census, Soraba Taluka of Shivamogga district has total population of 200,809 as per the Census 2011. Out of which 101,130 are males while 99,679 are females. In 2011 there were total 46,658 families residing in Sorab Taluka. The Average Sex Ratio of Sorab Taluka is 986.

References

External links
 Soraba in Mysore gazetter 1897 
Sorab

Taluks in Shimoga District
Cities and towns in Shimoga district